Moira Jones (born 1942) is a South African former cricketer who played as a batter. She appeared in one Test match for South Africa in 1972, against New Zealand, falling for a duck in her only innings. She played domestic cricket for Natal.

References

External links
 
 

1942 births
Living people
South African women cricketers
South Africa women Test cricketers
KwaZulu-Natal Coastal women cricketers
20th-century South African women
21st-century South African women